The 1917 Norwegian Football Cup was the 16th season of the Norwegian annual knockout football tournament. For the first time, the tournament was open for all members of NFF. Sarpsborg won their first title, having beaten Brann in the final. This was the first final that was played on grass.

First round

|}

Second round

| colspan="3" style="background:#97deff;"|26 August 1917

|}

Quarter-finals

| colspan="3" style="background:#97deff;"|23 September 1917

|}

Semi-finals

| colspan="3" style="background:#97deff;"|30 September 1917

|}

Final

See also
1917 in Norwegian football

References

Norwegian Football Cup seasons
Norway
Football Cup